Keith Standring (born 17 May 1965) is a former English cricketer. Standring was a left-handed batsman who bowled left-arm medium-fast. He was born in Luton, Bedfordshire.

Standring made his debut for Bedfordshire in the 1984 Minor Counties Championship against Staffordshire. He played Minor counties cricket for Bedfordshire from 1984 to 1995, which included 19 Minor Counties Championship matches and 5 MCCA Knockout Trophy matches. He made his only List A appearance against Warwickshire in the 1994 NatWest Trophy. In this match he scored an unbeaten 14 runs, while with the ball he took the wicket of Trevor Penney for the cost of 67 runs from 11 overs.

References

External links

1965 births
Living people
Cricketers from Luton
English cricketers
Bedfordshire cricketers